The 2012–13 Dayton Flyers men's basketball team represented the University of Dayton during the 2012–13 NCAA Division I men's basketball season. The Flyers, led by second year head coach Archie Miller, played their home games at the University of Dayton Arena and were members of the Atlantic 10 Conference. They finished the season 17–14, 7–9 in A-10 play to finish in a three way tie for 11th place. They lost in the first round of the Atlantic 10 tournament to Butler.

Roster

Schedule

|-
!colspan=12| Exhibition

|-
!colspan=12| Regular season

|-
!colspan=12|Atlantic 10 tournament

References

Dayton Flyers Men's
Dayton Flyers men's basketball seasons
Dayton
Dayton